KNSJ is a community radio station operating in the San Diego area on 89.1 MHz. It began airing on July 4, 2013. Content includes locally produced programs as well as news and information from the BBC and Pacifica Radio. Spanish-language programming airs from 8 p.m. to 11 p.m. The station's founder is Martin Eder.

See also
List of community radio stations in the United States

References

External links
KNSJ 89.1FM Official Website

NSJ
Community radio stations in the United States
Radio stations established in 2013
2013 establishments in California